Gilberto Lopes (born 30 May 1989) is a Brazilian long distance runner who specialises in the marathon. He competed in the marathon event at the 2015 World Championships in Athletics in Beijing, China.

References

External links

1989 births
Living people
Brazilian male long-distance runners
Brazilian male marathon runners
World Athletics Championships athletes for Brazil
Place of birth missing (living people)
South American Games bronze medalists for Brazil
South American Games medalists in athletics
Competitors at the 2010 South American Games